The Arabian green bee-eater (Merops cyanophrys) is a species of bird in the family Meropidae.
It is found throughout arid regions of the Arabian Peninsula from Saudi Arabia south to Yemen and east to Oman and the United Arab Emirates, and has expanded its range north to the Levant over the past few decades.

Taxonomy 
Although initially described as distinct species, the Arabian and African (M. viridissimus) green bee-eaters were grouped with the Asian green bee-eater (M. orientalis) as the green bee-eater by Charles Sibley and Burt Monroe in 1990. However, in 2014, the IUCN Red List and BirdLife International again split them as distinct species. A 2020 study found significant differences in morphology and voice between all three species, so they were also split from one another by the International Ornithologists' Union in 2021.

There are thought to be two subspecies:

 M. c. cyanophrys - western and southern Arabian Peninsula and southern Israel
 M. c. muscatensis - central and eastern Arabian Peninsula

Description 

It can be distinguished from M. orientalis and M. viridissimus by its shorter central tail feathers, the blue forehead, supercilium, and throat, as well as its broader black breast band. It also differs in voice.

Distribution 
It is found throughout arid, open regions of the Middle East with scattered trees, as well as wadis, gardens, and farmland. It ranges from western and central Saudi Arabia south to Yemen, and ranges north to Oman and the eastern United Arab Emirates, as well as scattered offshore islands in the western UAE. Agricultural expansion and irrigation has created new optimal habitat for this species, and thus its population has grown, which allowed it to colonize parts of the Levant (eastern Israel, western Jordan, and a very small portion of the Sinai Peninsula) prior to 2001. Due to this increasing population and it benefiting from human habitat modification, it is not thought to be under threat.

References

Arabian green bee-eater
Arabian green bee-eater
Taxa named by Jean Cabanis
Taxa named by Ferdinand Heine

Birds of the Middle East